The 1923 Tour de France was the 17th edition of Tour de France, one of cycling's Grand Tours. The Tour began in Paris with a flat stage on 24 June, and Stage 9 occurred on 10 July with a mountainous stage from Toulon. The race finished in Paris on 22 July.

Stage 9
10 July 1923 — Toulon to Nice,

Stage 10
12 July 1923 — Nice to Briançon,

Stage 11
14 July 1923 — Briançon to Geneva,

Stage 12
16 July 1923 — Geneva to Strasbourg,

Stage 13
18 July 1923 — Strasbourg to Metz,

Stage 14
20 July 1923 — Metz to Dunkerque,

Stage 15
22 July 1923 — Dunkerque to Paris,

References

1923 Tour de France
Tour de France stages